Lewis Mackenzie Brand (21 November 1925 – 15 February 1994) was a Progressive Conservative party member of the House of Commons of Canada. He was a physician and surgeon by career.

He was first elected at the Saskatoon riding in the 1965 general election. After serving only one term, the 27th Canadian Parliament, Brand was defeated at the newly configured Saskatoon—Humboldt riding by Otto Lang of the Liberal party in the 1968 federal election. Brand was also unsuccessful in unseating Lang in the 1972 election.

References

External links
 

1925 births
1994 deaths
British expatriates in Canada
Canadian surgeons
Members of the House of Commons of Canada from Saskatchewan
Progressive Conservative Party of Canada MPs
20th-century Canadian physicians
20th-century surgeons